This is a list of current Women's National Basketball Association head coaches.

Coaches

Note: Coaching records are correct through the end of the 2022 season.

External links
 WNBA.com Coaches Page

Head, Current
Coaches
Women's National Basketball Association head coaches